Black Feather Big Chief Lionel Delpit (1957July 7, 2011) was a tribal chief of the Black Feather Mardi Gras Indians. He was renowned for his intense singing voice and smooth dances during performances, as well as his natural leadership.

References

1957 births
2011 deaths
People from New Orleans
Date of birth missing